Martin Štajnoch (born 15 September 1990) is a Slovak professional ice hockey defenceman currently playing for EC Red Bull Salzburg of the ICE Hockey League.

Playing career
He played for the Thomas Sabo Ice Tigers of the Deutsche Eishockey Liga (DEL). He has formerly played in the Kontinental Hockey League (KHL) with HC Slovan Bratislava and HC Yugra.

During his second season in 2018–19 with Austrian club, EC Red Bull Salzburg of the EBEL, Štajnoch left nearing the completion of the regular season having appeared in 42 games, to join neighbouring league the DEL with the Thomas Sabo Ice Tigers for the remainder of the campaign on February 14, 2019. He registered 2 assists in 5 playoff contests.

Career statistics

Regular season and playoffs

International

Awards and honours

References

External links

1990 births
Living people
EHC Black Wings Linz players
HK Dukla Michalovce players
HC Dynamo Pardubice players
Stadion Hradec Králové players
EC Red Bull Salzburg players
Rubin Tyumen players
HC Slovan Bratislava players
Slovak ice hockey defencemen
Thomas Sabo Ice Tigers players
HC Yugra players
Sportspeople from Bojnice
Slovak expatriate ice hockey players in the Czech Republic
Slovak expatriate ice hockey players in Russia
Slovak expatriate ice hockey players in Germany
Expatriate ice hockey players in  Austria
Slovak expatriate sportspeople in Austria